Inspiration is a 1928 American silent drama film directed by Bernard McEveety and starring George Walsh, Gladys Frazin and Marguerite Clayton. It is also known by the alternative title of Love's Test.

Synopsis
When he is falsely accused of having fathered a child with another woman, a man is abandoned by his fiancée and disinherited by his father. He leaves for China. There he meets a dancer, Carlita, who persuades him to return home and establish the truth, despite the fact she herself loves him.

Cast
 George Walsh as Gerald Erskine 
 Gladys Frazin as Carlita 
 Marguerite Clayton as Mary Keith 
 Earle Larrimore as Jimmie 
 Bradley Barker as George Gordon 
 Ali Yousoff as Pietro 
 John Costello as Capt. Broady 
 Buddy Harris as Bobby 
 Bernice Vert as Anna Martin

References

Bibliography
 Munden, Kenneth White. The American Film Institute Catalog of Motion Pictures Produced in the United States, Part 1. University of California Press, 1997.

External links

1928 films
1928 drama films
Silent American drama films
Films directed by Bernard McEveety
American silent feature films
1920s English-language films
American black-and-white films
1920s American films